A list of the tallest skyscrapers in Morocco. Most of the structures listed are located in Casablanca.

This list contains completed and topped out skyscrapers located within Morocco that are over 100 m (328 ft) in height. The list is sorted by official height; where two or more structures share the same height, equal ranking is given and the structures are then listed in alphabetical order.

History 
Historically, Morocco's tallest skyscraper was the Casablanca Twin Center in Casablanca, which held the position for 20 years until the completion of the Casablanca Finance City Tower in 2019. The Mohammed VI Tower in Salé, will take the title when it's completed in 2022.

Tallest skyscrapers

On-hold, approved or proposed

See also 
 List of tallest structures in Morocco
 List of tallest buildings in Morocco
 List of tallest buildings in Rabat

References 

Skyscrapers in Morocco
Tallest